Zdenko Feyfar (1913–2001) was a Czechoslovak photographer.

His work is included in the collections of the Museum of Fine Arts Houston and the George Eastman Museum.

References

1913 births
2001 deaths
Czechoslovak photographers